Archibald Russell was a tall ship built in 1905 by Scotts Shipbuilding and Engineering Company, Greenock, for John Hardie & Son, Glasgow. She was a four-masted steel barque, equipped with two 120' long bilge keels, and rigged with royal sails over double top-gallant sails.

The Archibald Russell sailed the world delivering a variety of cargo (including timber, grain, nitrate, and coal) to various ports in the UK, Germany, Spain, Australia, Brazil and other countries.

In 1923 she was sold for £5500 to Gustaf Erikson, who was famous for the fleet of windjammers he operated, mainly on the grain trade from Australia to Europe. A crewman on the vessel in 1929 was Australian journalist Ken Attiwill on a voyage from Melbourne to Ireland. He later wrote a book about the voyage. The ship kept sailing for Erikson until outbreak of World War II in 1939.

At one point prior to the outbreak of war in 1939 the Honourable Company of Master Mariners considered purchasing the ship to use as a floating livery hall, after it became apparent that the possibility of building a hall in the City of London had been rendered very remote. This idea was ultimately abandoned; however they later acquired and converted HMS Wellington to use for this purpose.

In June 1941 Archibald Russell was detained by the British government, after Finland joined the war on the German side. During the rest of the war, the ship was used as a store ship at Goole. After the war the ship was returned to its Finnish owner (in 1948), but soon after was sold to the British Iron & Steel Corporation in 1949, and broken up later that year by J.J. King & Co., of Gateshead-on-Tyne.

See also
List of large sailing vessels

References

External links 

 Archibald Russell at www.bruzelius.info

1905 ships